Schinia carminatra is a moth of the family Noctuidae. It is found in Colorado and Oklahoma.

The wingspan is about 10 mm.

External links
Images
Butterflies and Moths of North America

Schinia
Moths of North America
Moths described in 1903